"The Quiet Things That No One Ever Knows" is a song by American rock band Brand New. It served as the first single from their second album Deja Entendu and was released on October 6, 2003 in the United Kingdom on 7" vinyl. 

Described by Stereogum as likely "Brand New’s most enduring contribution to the mainstream," the song became the band's first charting single, peaking at No. 39 on the UK Singles Chart and No. 37 on the US Billboard Alternative Songs chart. However, as Brand New's sound evolved and became less accessible, the band stopped playing the song regularly during concerts, only adding it to the setlist occasionally.

Release 
The single was originally released commercially on 7" vinyl in the UK on October 6, 2003. It was re-released as a CD, DVD and 7" vinyl single set to promote their UK tour with Incubus on May 17, 2004.

The song is featured in both the soundtracks to the video games NHL 2004 and Tiger Woods PGA Tour 2004.

Reception 
Stereogum named "The Quiet Things That No One Ever Knows" as Brand New's ninth-best song in 2015, recalling how "it was damn near inescapable during its reign, and it’s come to represent all the best qualities of that era of alternative rock" but also admitting that "if it were the only Brand New song you’d ever heard, you would have a lot different impression of the band than what they actually were, and it would probably be a lot easier to sweep them under the rug as just another emo band." 

Brooklyn Vegan contrasted its "pop punk chorus" that "made that album famous" with the "post-rocky intro song 'Tautou'" when discussing Deja Entendu's role in Brand New's musical maturation.

Music video
The music video was directed by Kurt St. Thomas and Mike Gioscia. In the video, Jesse Lacey crashes his car while driving with his girlfriend (played by Alison Haislip). Afterwards, he is seen sitting with her in an ambulance. In the middle of the song, her heart stops, and she is taken to the emergency room where medics try to save her life. During the bridge, a waiting room is shown where the other band members wait for the result of her condition; Jesse is shown in a room full of candles. When the bridge ends, she wakes and opens her eyes. At the end of the video, Jesse is shown lying on the ground at the scene of the accident, suggesting that he did not actually survive the crash. Between the storyline, the band is shown in a room where they play the song, with Jesse slowly fading out at the end.

Track listing

Personnel
Brand New
Jesse Lacey – vocals, rhythm guitar
Vincent Accardi – lead guitar
Garrett Tierney – bass
Brian Lane – drums, percussion

Charts

References

External links
 The Quiet Things That No One Ever Knows at AllMusic

2003 songs
2003 singles
2004 singles
Songs written by Jesse Lacey
Songs written by Vincent Accardi
Brand New (band) songs